Zhu Benqiang (born 13 March 1979) is a former professional tennis player from the People's Republic of China.

Biography
Zhu, a right-handed player from Hubei, was a regular member of the China Davis Cup team from 1999 to 2005. He played in a total of 15 ties and competed in 30 matches, for 19 wins. One of his wins was a rare triple bagel, over Kuwait's Musaad Al-Jazzaf in Shenzhen in 2002. He won China the Asia/Oceania Zone Group II final against South Korea in 2004 when he came from two sets down to defeat Young-Jun Kim in the fifth and decisive match.

He won a gold medal with Li Na in the mixed doubles at the 2001 Summer Universiade and competed in the 2002 Asian Games.

His best performance on the ATP Tour was in the doubles at the 2003 Shanghai Open. He and partner Zeng Shaoxuan became the first players from China to reach a tour-level doubles final. They lost the final to Wayne Arthurs and Paul Hanley.

ATP Tour career finals

Doubles: 1 (0–1)

References

External links
 
 
 

1979 births
Living people
Chinese male tennis players
Tennis players from Hubei
Tennis players at the 2002 Asian Games
Universiade medalists in tennis
Universiade gold medalists for China
Universiade bronze medalists for China
Asian Games competitors for China
Medalists at the 1999 Summer Universiade
Medalists at the 2001 Summer Universiade